Walting is a municipality and a village in the district of Eichstätt in Bavaria, Germany.

See also
Gungolding

References

External links

 Walting official website

Eichstätt (district)